"Pilot" is the series premiere of the American comedy-drama television series Louie. It first aired on the FX channel in the United States on June 29, 2010, and was written, directed, and edited by the show's creator and star, Louis C.K.

Plot
Louie C.K. is a divorced middle-aged comedian with two small daughters. In his stand-up set, Louie says he is no longer comfortable with anything in life, except from looking after his children. He explains how he volunteers at their school, because no other parents do so.

He volunteers during a field trip to the New York Botanical Garden, which they are travelling to on a school bus. A teacher, named Susan (Ashlie Atkinson), thanks Louie for volunteering and they get on the bus. The bus driver (William Stephenson) asks Louie where he wishes to go. Bewildered, Louie tells him where they are going, but the bus driver does not know the directions. He tells him to go the West Side Highway, while he finds the directions. After they set off, Louie phones the New York Botanical Garden and asks for directions from the highway. The woman on the phone tells him it is illegal to drive a bus on the West Side Highway. They approach a bridge, only just scraping through and breaking a tire, terrifying everybody on board. They pull over in Harlem. Louie has a conversation with the bus driver, who is reading a newspaper, telling him that he should have more responsibility for his passengers. The driver exits the bus and tells Louie to remember that he was responsible for being on the highway in the first place. Louie puts the darker-skinned children in the window seats, as they are in a largely black neighborhood, which Susan deems offensive. Louie calls his friend, Dimitrio, who sends multiple limousines.

In his stand-up set, Louie says he has no optimism about anything in life, especially relationships. While waiting for his date (Chelsea Peretti) outside her apartment, Louie encounters an older naked woman (Kathleen Butler) hiding herself behind her door who asks him to stop yelling as it is making her "feel vulnerable". Louie says that she will show him her body eventually, she eventually does so before repeatedly shouting "Pig!". His date comes out of her apartment and sees that Louie is wearing a suit; he explains by saying he has just attended a funeral reunion for his father. While leaving the apartment, Louie unsuccessfully attempts to kiss her. They go to a pizzeria, where Louie uncomfortably tells her about his daughters and his date mistakes Louie for an angry man (Jay Oakerson) knocking on the toilet door. At a bench by the river, Louie says he is not good at dating, to which she sarcastically replies "I think you're doing great". He says he is a real man because he properly raises his daughters, and asks why he has to impress her and not the contrary. Louie attempts to kiss her, but she runs away and gets on a nearby helicopter, which flies away as she extends her middle-finger.

In his closing stand-up set, he tells a story about putting his dog down and a dream he had later about it resurrecting, coming home, and eventually having to be put down again. Louie takes his daughters to their mother's house.

Reception

Ratings
The episode was watched by 1.11 million people in the United States.

Critical reception
The A.V. Clubs Nathan Rabin gave the episode a positive "A−" score, saying "C.K plays to his strengths, turning the half-hour comedy into a forum for short filmmaking and incisive stand-up comedy." Max Nicholson of IGN gave the episode 8.0/10, calling it "a bold and unique type of show that manages to successfully blend stage performance and narrative storytelling in a fresh and innovating way."

References

External links

2010 American television episodes
Louie
Louie (American TV series) episodes